Mohammad Yusuf Parray, better known as Kuka Parray, was an Indian former MLA from Kashmir and the founder of the Jammu & Kashmir Awami League. He was a Kashmiri folk singer, before he founded the pro-government militia, Ikhwan-ul-Muslemoon,  that targeted militants.  His death was considered a major blow to the Indian forces in their fight against the terrorism in Jammu and Kashmir. The then Chief Minister, Mufti Mohammad Sayeed, described his murder as "a setback to the peace process".

Death
Parray was on his way to inaugurate a cricket match in Sonawari, District Bandipora of Jammu and Kashmir state, when hiding militants opened fire on his car. He died en route to SKIMS hospital.

References 

Year of birth missing
2003 deaths
Indian people of Kashmiri descent
Kashmiri people
Indian Muslims
Kashmiri Muslims
Indian politicians
Jammu and Kashmir politicians
Kashmiri militants
Deaths by firearm in India